House of Haji Amir is a historical-architectural monument built by the merchant Haji Amir in the middle of the 18th century, located in the Tabrizli neighbourhood of Shusha city.

About 
On the first floor of a two-story residential building there are service and partial residential rooms, and on the second floor there are living rooms and bedrooms. However, on the second floor, instead of the loggia, which is traditional for Shusha houses, it has an open balcony located in the same facade line as the house.

An open staircase built into the facade of the house leads to the balcony. It is possible to pass from the balcony to a small passage room. The door opens from that room to two rooms located on the sides. From one of those two rooms, which was used as a bedroom, a latticed window opens to the inner courtyard of the house. The walls and ceiling of another room designed for welcoming guests are decorated with fresco paintings.

References

Sources 
 
 
 

Monuments and memorials in Shusha